Donte Ingram (born August 15, 1996) is an American basketball player for Donar of the BNXT League. He played college basketball for the Loyola Ramblers. Before Loyola, he attended Simeon Career Academy and was teammates with NBA player Jabari Parker. Ingram drew national attention after helping the 2017–18 Ramblers reach the Final Four round of the 2018 NCAA tournament. He was named to the second-team All-Missouri Valley Conference as a senior.

Early life and high school
Ingram was born on August 15, 1996. He is the son of Don Ingram, who played basketball in the Marines, and grew up in Danville, Illinois. In middle school he competed in Amateur Athletic Union (AAU) play for Team Trouble, alongside future Nevada player Jordan Caroline.

He attended Danville High School for two seasons. He competed in AAU for Mean Streets, and Jabari Parker, who played on a different AAU team, convinced him to transfer to Simeon Career Academy in Chicago. As a junior, Ingram was utilized as the sixth man on the Class 4A state championship team. Due to residency issues, Ingram was declared ineligible by the Illinois High School Association on January 15 but was reinstated on February 5. Milton Doyle, a native of Chicago, persuaded Ingram to come to Loyola (Illinois) after receiving a scholarship offer from Hampton University. One of the reasons Ingram picked the team is because his older brother DaJuan Gouard, who is now a community college coach, played for a Horizon League championship in 2002 with the Ramblers.

College career
When Ingram arrived at Loyola, the team had had three straight losing seasons, but he liked coach Porter Moser and the "family" feel of the program. He was an important piece of the 2014–15 Loyola Ramblers team that won the 2015 College Basketball Invitational as a freshman, averaging 5 points and 3.1 rebounds per game. As a sophomore, he posted 7.4 points per game. His best game that year was a 19-point performance against Bradley on March 3, 2016.

Ingram sprained his MCL in early December 2016 but recovered quickly. On December 17, he had 20 points and nine rebounds in an 81–75 win over UIC and hit the three-pointer to send the game to overtime. Ingram set career highs with 30 points and 10 rebounds in a 102–98 loss to Drake on December 29. He improved his scoring average to 13.6 points per game as a junior and added 6.6 rebounds per game. Ingram led the conference in three point shooting with 47.3 percent and was named to the Third Team All-Missouri Valley Conference.

As a senior, Ingram averaged 11.5 points and 6.3 rebounds per game. He was named to the Second team All-Missouri Valley Conference. Ingram was an important contributor to Loyola's 10–1 start, the best in 52 years, which included an upset of Florida. He contributed 18 points and eight rebounds in the final of the 2018 Missouri Valley tournament against Illinois State and was named most outstanding player. With the win, Loyola reached its first NCAA tournament since 1985. The Ramblers received an 11 seed, and in the Round of 64, Ingram hit a buzzer-beating 3-pointer on a pass from Marques Townes to defeat Miami 64–62 and finished with 13 points. He led Loyola on an improbable run to its first Final Four since 1963, scoring 12 points in the Elite Eight win against Kansas State. He received some media attention when a message from Chance the Rapper prompted him to open a Twitter account. After the season Ingram signed with Edge Sports International in preparation for the 2018 NBA draft.

College statistics

|-
| style="text-align:left;"| 2014–15
| style="text-align:left;"| Loyola (Ill.)
| 37 || 1 || 18.3 || .447 || .373 || .645 || 3.1 || 0.6 || 0.3 || 0.1 || 5.0
|-
| style="text-align:left;"| 2015–16
| style="text-align:left;"| Loyola (Ill.)
| 32 || 26 || 25.9 || .394 || .281 || .843 || 4.1 || 0.8 || 0.4 || 0.3 || 7.4
|-
| style="text-align:left;"| 2016–17
| style="text-align:left;"| Loyola (Ill.)
| 28 || 29 || 32.6 || .529 || .458 || .676 || 6.8 || 1.3 || 0.9 || 0.2 || 13.8
|-
| style="text-align:left;"| 2017–18
| style="text-align:left;"| Loyola (Ill.)
| 38 || 38 || 30.6 || .443 || .392 || .680 || 6.4 || 1.6 || 0.9 || 0.4 || 11.0
|-
|colspan=13 style="text-align:center;" |Source: RealGM

Professional career
Ingram worked out with several teams in preparation for the NBA draft and was praised for his size, versatility, shooting and defense. Despite going undrafted, he was signed by the Chicago Bulls to an NBA Summer League roster. In five games in the Las Vegas Summer League, Ingram averaged 6.0 points, 4.8 rebounds, and 1.4 assists per game, shooting .312 from the field. His best game came in the fourth game against the Dallas Mavericks where he finished with 13 points, four assists and two rebounds. He signed with the Mavericks on October 8, 2018. He was waived three days later. He was then added to the roster of the Texas Legends, the Mavericks’ NBA G League affiliate. On the season, Ingram appeared in 43 games for the Legends, averaging 3.7 points and 2.2 rebounds per game.

For the 2019–20 season, Ingram was acquired by the Hornets' NBA G League affiliate, the Greensboro Swarm. On February 26, 2020, Ingram scored 17 points in a 129–115 loss to the Westchester Knicks. He averaged 4.8 points and 2.4 rebounds in 16.6 minutes per game.

On February 11, 2021, Ingram signed with the Nelson Giants for the 2021 New Zealand NBL season. He averaged 18.3 points, 6.5 rebounds, 2.4 assists, and 1.7 steals per game.

Ingram signed with Dutch club Donar of the BNXT League on June 12.

Personal life
Ingram has said that he owns at least 50 pairs of sneakers. His teammate and friend, Saieed Ivey, was killed in June 2016; as a memorial, Ingram had custom Nike shoes made with the number 2 — Ivey's jersey number — on the top of the shoe and the acronym FINAO (failure is not an option), one of Ivey's favorite sayings, on the side.

References

External links
Loyola Ramblers bio

1996 births
Living people
American expatriate basketball people in the Netherlands
American expatriate basketball people in New Zealand
American men's basketball players
Basketball players from Chicago
Donar (basketball club) players
Greensboro Swarm players
Loyola Ramblers men's basketball players
Nelson Giants players
Shooting guards
Small forwards
Texas Legends players